Zhao Wei is a Chinese gangster and the founder of Hong Kong-registered company Kings Romans Group (formed in 2007), which owns the Kings Romans casino franchise. The United States Treasury Department imposed sanctions on the Zhao Wei Transnational Criminal Organization (Zhao Wei TCO) in 2018 for its involvement in laundering money and assisting in the storage and distribution of heroin, methamphetamine, and other narcotics for illicit networks, including the United Wa State Army which operates in Myanmar. Based in Laos in the Golden Triangle Special Economic Zone (GTSEZ), Zhao Wei is also reported to engage in human trafficking, bribery, wildlife trafficking, and other forms of transnational organized crime. Much of this illicit activity is conducted through the Kings Romans casino organisation in the GTSEZ.

Background
Zhao Wei was born in Heilongjiang or Liaoning, China on 16 September 1952. He began as a timber trader before moving, in the 1990s, to Macau, where he holds permanent residency, and began investing in casinos. In 2001, Zhao Wei moved to Mong La, Myanmar where he founded his first casino franchise, Landun Entertainment. He established ties with the National Democratic Alliance Army whose leader, Sai Leun financed the operations of the casino industry in Mong La. In 2005, China imposed a travel ban to Mong La following reports of officials gambling state funds. The travel ban led to the shuttering of casinos in the city.

Golden Triangle Special Economic Zone 

Soon after the travel ban was imposed, Zhao was invited by government of Laos to invest in Bokeo Province. In 2007, Zhao negotiated and struck a 99-year lease to establish and operate the Golden Triangle Special Economic Zone in the same province. In early October 2020, a US$50 million dollar investment to build a port in the Laotian town of Ban Mom, directly north of the Golden Triangle Special Economic Zone, was made by Osiano Trading Sole Co., a partner or front company of Zhao Wei and his organization. The United Nations Office on Drugs and Crime (UNODC) has raised concerns about Laos being used by organized crime to traffic drugs, precursor chemicals, and other illicit commodities, and that the purchase of the Ban Mom port is representative of organized crime infiltrating infrastructure in the region. The Ban Mom port is on a remote stretch of the Mekong River which has been confirmed as a smuggling route for trafficking drugs and precursor chemicals into and out of the Golden Triangle.

Personal life 
Zhao Wei is married to Chinese Australian Su Guiqin (born 1960). Alongside her husband, Su Guiqin runs the Kings Romans casino.

References

Further reading
 

Chinese gangsters

Year of birth missing (living people)
Living people
Triad members